The 1995–96 Sri Lankan cricket season featured a Test series with Sri Lanka playing against Zimbabwe.

Honours
 P Saravanamuttu Trophy – Colombo Cricket Club
 Hatna Trophy – Nondescripts Cricket Club
 Most runs – RP Arnold 1430 @ 79.44 (HS 217*)
 Most wickets – M Jayasena 67 @ 21.41 (BB 5-72)

Test series
Sri Lanka won the Test series 2-0:
 1st Test @ R Premadasa Stadium, Colombo – Sri Lanka won by an innings and 77 runs
 2nd Test @ Sinhalese Sports Club Ground, Colombo – Sri Lanka won by 10 wickets

External sources
  CricInfo – brief history of Sri Lankan cricket
 CricketArchive – Tournaments in Sri Lanka

Further reading
 Wisden Cricketers' Almanack 1997

Sri Lankan cricket seasons from 1972–73 to 1999–2000